Réka Tenki (born June 18, 1986) is a Hungarian actress.  Her film credits include On Body and Soul and Budapest Noir. Her television credits include .

Early life
Tenki was born in Debrecen.

External links 
 

1986 births
Hungarian television actresses
Living people